The Buenos Aires leaf-eared mouse (Phyllotis bonariensis) is a species of rodent in the family Cricetidae. It is found only in Argentina.

References

Phyllotis
Mammals of Argentina
Mammals described in 1964
Taxonomy articles created by Polbot